The Roland MKS-80 Super Jupiter is a rack mount sound module version of the Roland Jupiter-6 and the Roland Jupiter-8 synthesizers. It is an 8-voice polyphonic analog synthesizer that was manufactured by Roland between 1984 and 1987. It is the only one of the MKS series of synthesizers to have analogue voltage-controlled oscillators (VCOs) instead of analogue digitally-controlled oscillators (DCOs). The voice architecture is almost identical to the Jupiter-6 synthesizer. The service manual states that "The module board of MKS-80 features the following in addition to that of JP-6, its brother module. 1) HPF. 2) Low boost circuit in the 2nd VCA. 3) DC supply current boost circuit (IC50)." The unit is capable of producing most of the Jupiter-8's signature sounds, in addition to many sounds unique to the MKS-80. 

In February 1985, Roland started producing a new revision of MKS-80, known as "Rev 5", with a new generation of both Roland VCO's, VCA's and filter. The Rev 5 filter was also used in JX-8P, JX-10 and MKS-70 synthesizers.

Features
The voice architecture of the MKS-80 is fully analog with 8 polyphonic voices with 2 voltage controlled oscillators (VCO) per voice, using the Curtis CEM3340 VCO integrated circuit. The unit also includes one voltage controlled filter (VCF) and one voltage controlled amplifier (VCA) per voice.

The MKS-80 has a 64 patch internal memory (8 banks of 8 patches each) along with an optional memory cartridge called the M-64C with room for another 128 (2 banks of 64 each). A full MIDI implementation is built into the MKS-80, with MIDI IN, OUT and THRU jacks positioned at the rear of the unit.

External programmer
The MPG-80 is the optional programmer designed specifically for the MKS-80, providing direct access to the majority of the MKS-80's features. The MPG-80 connects to the MKS-80 via the Controller port using a special cable. When used with an MPG-80, the MKS-80's MIDI IN port is not used in favor of the MIDI IN on the MPG-80.

Factory presets
The Factory Presets were created by Eric Persing and Dan Desousa

Confusion with Jupiter 8
In 1998, UK magazine Sound on Sound published an article about MKS-80. It contained a critical typographical error; instead of referring to Jupiter 6, the comment about the rack version referred to the Jupiter 8, leading to serious confusion and even spreading myths across online forums. However, once one replaces the numbers 8 and 6, the article makes sense: 

"The MKS80 delivered the entire Jupiter 6 wish-list and more, including a much larger memory and upgraded internal electronics. Now let's get one thing clear -- despite a few commentators postulating otherwise, the MKS80 had nothing to do with the Jupiter 8. Although there were ultimately to be two versions of the instrument (one with the Jupiter 6's Curtis oscillators, the other with custom chips developed by Roland themselves) both retained the architecture of the Jupiter 6, sounded identical to the Jupiter 6 and, apart from their many enhancements, were the rackmount module versions of the Jupiter 6.".

Notable users
 Andy Whitmore (Record Producer / Keyboard Player, London UK)
 Walter Afanasieff
 Blancmange
 John Carpenter
 Daft Punk
 Hans Zimmer
 Harold Faltermeyer
 Dave Grusin
 Herbie Hancock
 Klaus Schulze
 Tangerine Dream
 Madonna – bass in "Into The Groove", "La Isla Bonita", "Open Your Heart", "Who's That Girl"
 Vince Clarke
 Snap! (Luca Anzilotti a.k.a. John VIRGO Garrett III)
 Pet Shop Boys
 Enigma
 Michael Cretu
 Aphex Twin
 MSTRKRFT
 Talk Talk
 Orchestral Manoeuvres in the Dark
 Ulf Langheinrich
 Vangelis
 Mike Oldfield
 Ray Lynch

References

External links
 MKS-80's factory presets demo
 MKS-80 MP3s at www.babic.com
 Owner's manual
 Vintage Synth Explorer MKS-80 page
 MKS-80 Owner's site with numerous images

MKS-80
Analog synthesizers
Polyphonic synthesizers